Robert Hugh Parker (29 September 1934 – 29 August 2009) was a New Zealand rower who represented his country at two British Empire and Commonwealth Games and one Olympic Games.

Born in Auckland on 29 September 1934, Parker was a junior rower at the Mercer Rowing Club when he teamed up with Reg Douglas in the double scull in 1952. In 1954 the duo won both the double scull and the coxless pair at the New Zealand Rowing Championships in Picton.

At both the 1954 British Empire and Commonwealth Games in Vancouver and 1958 British Empire and Commonwealth Games in Cardiff, Parker and Douglas combined to win the gold medal in the men's coxless pair. The combination also won the silver medal in the men's double sculls at the Vancouver games.

Parker and Douglas also competed together at the 1956 Summer Olympics in Melbourne, finishing third in their semi-final in the coxless pair, missing out in a place in the final.

In 1962, Parker married Raywin Morris at Tuakau. He died in 2009.

References

External links
 
 

1934 births
2009 deaths
Rowers from Auckland
New Zealand male rowers
Olympic rowers of New Zealand
Rowers at the 1954 British Empire and Commonwealth Games
Rowers at the 1958 British Empire and Commonwealth Games
Rowers at the 1956 Summer Olympics
Commonwealth Games silver medallists for New Zealand
Commonwealth Games gold medallists for New Zealand
Commonwealth Games medallists in rowing
Medallists at the 1954 British Empire and Commonwealth Games
Medallists at the 1958 British Empire and Commonwealth Games